The Ballad of Nessie is a 2011 traditionally animated short film produced by Walt Disney Animation Studios. It was directed by Stevie Wermers-Skelton and Kevin Deters, and produced by the team behind Disney's 2007 animated short film How to Hook Up Your Home Theater.

The short, narrated by Billy Connolly, is a Disney adaptation of the origin of the Loch Ness Monster, Nessie.

Plot
A gentle creature named Nessie lives happily in a small pond with her best friend MacQuack, a rubber duck. When rich developer MacFroogal destroys the pond and land surrounding it to build a giant miniature golf course, Nessie is forced to search for a new home. She finds rejection everywhere, and is always ordered to keep a stiff upper lip whenever she feels like crying. Finally, Nessie loses all hope and starts crying for weeks on end. When she cannot cry anymore, she finds that her tears have created Loch Ness, a new home for her and MacQuack.

A mid-credits scene reveals that MacFroogal's golf course is flooded out as well. MacFroogal breaks down in tears as he and his assistants sail away on part of a large sign, while the water knocks off some of the letters on the remaining part, leaving the word "MacFool" behind.

Release
The short premiered on March 5, 2011, at Anima 2011, the International Animation Film Festival of Brussel. In the US it accompanied the theatrical release of Winnie the Pooh, which premiered on July 15, 2011.

Home media
The short was released on October 25, 2011, as a bonus feature on the Blu-ray, DVD, and digital download release of Winnie the Pooh. The Ballad of Nessie was released on the Walt Disney Animation Studios Short Films Collection Blu-ray on August 18, 2015.

Award nomination
The Ballad of Nessie was nominated for a 2012 Annie Award for Best Animated Short Subject.

References

External links
 Official website archived from the original on February 27, 2012
 
 

2010s Disney animated short films
Loch Ness Monster in film
2011 animated films
2011 short films
2011 films
Films scored by Michael Giacchino
American animated short films
2010s English-language films
Films directed by Kevin Deters